The Monaco women's national under-18 basketball team is a national basketball team of Monaco, administered by the Fédération Monégasque de Basketball.
It represents the country in women's international under-18 basketball competitions.

The team won two medals at the FIBA U18 Women's European Championship Division C.

See also
Monaco women's national basketball team
Monaco women's national under-16 basketball team
Monaco men's national under-18 basketball team

References

External links
Archived records of Monaco team participations

Basketball in Monaco
Women's national under-18 basketball teams
Basketball